Mulgirigala Raja Maha Vihara (Sinhalaː මුල්ගිරිගල රජ මහා විහාරය) is an ancient Buddhist temple in Puttalam District, Sri Lanka. The temple is situated at Mullegama village, about  far from the Nawagattegama town. The temple has been formally recognised by the Government as an archaeological site in Sri Lanka. It is believed that the temple was built by King Dappula during the Anuradhapura period. The monastery complex consisted of a number of caves and inscriptions, constructed about 300 years ago.

References

Buddhist temples in Puttalam District
Archaeological protected monuments in Puttalam District